Sachith Aloka is a Sri Lankan international footballer who plays as a forward.

References

Sri Lankan footballers
1990 births
Living people
Sri Lanka international footballers
Association football forwards